The Alabama State Hornets and Lady Hornets represent Alabama State University in Montgomery, Alabama in intercollegiate athletics. They field sixteen teams including men and women's basketball, cross country, golf, tennis, and track and field; women's-only bowling, soccer, softball, and volleyball; and men's-only baseball and football. The Hornets compete in the NCAA Division I and are members of the Southwestern Athletic Conference. Adidas is the current sponsor of the Alabama State University Athletic Department.

Teams

See also
Magic City Classic

References

External links